Thomas Township is an inactive township in Ripley County, in the U.S. state of Missouri.

Thomas Township was erected in 1872, taking its name from Ad Thomas, a pioneer citizen.

References

Townships in Missouri
Townships in Ripley County, Missouri